The Round House (or "Circambulant House") is a house in Wilton, Connecticut, built by architect Richard T. Foster in 1968. The building can rotate 360 degrees, providing every room a view of the landscape. It combines engineering from Germany, local Connecticut steel, and stone from the Dolomites. It was the Foster family’s primary residence for more than 35 years. Foster lived there until his death in 2002. 

In 2012, Mack Scogin Merrill Elam Architects was hired to upgrade and adapt the structure to contemporary standards:

References

Houses in Fairfield County, Connecticut
Houses completed in 1968
Buildings and structures in Wilton, Connecticut
1968 establishments in Connecticut